Södra Latin, officially Södra Latins gymnasium, ("Southern Latin" in Swedish) is an upper secondary school ("gymnasieskola"), situated in Södermalm, Stockholm. The current school building was inaugurated in 1891.

History
Södra Latin has a rich history, as its predecessor Södermalms Pedagogia employed its first headmaster as far back as in 1654. In 1820 it became a trivialskola and in 1879 it was merged with the southern part of Stockholms gymnasium, its new name being Stockholms högre allmänna å latinlinjen fullständiga läroverk å Södermalm. The school changed its name multiple times through the years until it decided upon its current one in 1971.

The current school building was designed by Per Emanuel Werming and opened in 1891 (its twin building Norra Real having opened a full year earlier). The structure was conceived in a way that would allow daylight to directly illuminate all rooms and corridors inside it, with 21 classrooms having been built in total. Typical of the design - in addition to the monumental orange-red brick facade - is a semicircular assembly hall placed centrally in the school's building plan. The last renovation took place in 1996.

Södra Latin was a boys-only institution until 1961.

Education
In modern times, Södra Latin is known for its high-level schooling in the arts. Between 1976 and 1978 the establishment successively replaced the music department of Statens normalskola in Östermalm, becoming consummate in 1980. In 1985 it launched one of the country's first drama programmes. Besides aesthetically and artistically oriented programmes, the school also offers education in the humanities and natural sciences, among others.

Notable alumni
Several prominent Swedish people have received their schooling at Södra Latin, many of them artists or other cultural personalities.
Per Ahlmark, politician
Alba August, actress
Stig Dagerman, writer
Dirty Loops, band
Isaac Grünewald, painter
Carola Häggkvist, singer
Olle Hellbom, film director
Mattias Schulstad, classical guitarist
Jonas Hassen Khemiri, writer
Joel Kinnaman, actor
John Landquist, literary critic
Lykke Li, recording artist
Max Martin, songwriter and record producer
Helena Mattson, actress
Hjalmar Mehr, politician
Klas Östergren, novelist and screenwriter
Peter Pohl, author
Noomi Rapace, actress
Åsa Romson, politician
Mona Sahlin, politician
Helena af Sandeberg, actress
Danny Saucedo, singer
Alexander Skarsgård, actor
Bill Skarsgård, actor
Gustaf Skarsgård, actor
Sven Stolpe, writer
Anna-Lena Strindlund, actress
Tomas Tranströmer, poet and Nobel Prize winner
Yung Lean, rapper and singer
Lucas Brar guitarist

Notable teachers
Alf Ahlberg
Immanuel Björkhagen
Svetlana Eriksson
Börge Ring
Roger Thorstensson

See also

Education in Sweden
Norra Real
Östra Real
Norra Latin
Kungsholmens gymnasium
Viktor Rydberg Gymnasium

References

External links
 
Wikimedia Commons
Stockholm's inner-city upper secondary schools at the turn of the 20th century 

Schools in Stockholm
Education in Stockholm
Gymnasiums (school) in Sweden
Buildings and structures in Stockholm
Music in Stockholm
Music schools in Sweden